Nods is a former commune in the Doubs department in the Bourgogne-Franche-Comté region in eastern France. It is the seat of the commune of Les Premiers-Sapins.

Geography

History 
On 1 January 2016, Athose, Chasnans, Hautepierre-le-Châtelet, Nods, Rantechaux and Vanclans merged becoming one commune called Les Premiers-Sapins.

Population

See also
 Communes of the Doubs department

References

External links

 Nods on the intercommunal Web site of the department 

Former communes of Doubs